Charcoal Kilns may refer to:

Walker Charcoal Kiln —  Arizona
Panamint Charcoal Kilns — Death Valley National Park,  California
Cottonwood Charcoal Kilns — Owens Lake, California
Birch Creek Charcoal Kilns, Leadore, Idaho — listed on the National Register of Historic Places as "Charcoal Kilns"
Charcoal Kilns (Eureka, Utah) — listed on the National Register of Historic Places
Piedmont Charcoal Kilns —  Wyoming

Charcoal